Raymond Cameron (born 7 March 1982) is a New Zealand former basketball player who played in the National Basketball League (NBL).

Cameron's family has a strong connection to the Northland Region in the far north of New Zealand, with his brother Pero and his mother Mata being notable Whangarei basketball identities. Cameron was raised in Portland, and attended Whangarei Boys' High School and Hamilton's Church College of New Zealand.

Cameron was a member of the Waikato Titans' back-to-back NBL championship squad in 2001 and 2002. He re-joined the Waikato team, now known as the Pistons, in 2007. In 2008 and 2009, he was a member of the Pistons' back-to-back title run, thus earning four championships for his career. Cameron continued on with the Pistons the following two seasons, where in July 2011, he played his 100th NBL game. Following the team's withdrawal from the league in 2012, Cameron retired from the NBL.

References

External links
Ray Cameron at australiabasket.com

1982 births
Living people
New Zealand men's basketball players
People educated at the Church College of New Zealand
People educated at Whangarei Boys' High School
People from the Northland Region
Shooting guards
Small forwards
Waikato Pistons players
Waikato Titans players